R. A. Brualdi is a professor emeritus of combinatorial mathematics at the University of Wisconsin–Madison.

Brualdi received his Ph.D. from Syracuse University in 1964; his advisor was H. J. Ryser. Brualdi is an Editor-in-Chief of the Electronic Journal of Combinatorics. He has over 200 publications in several mathematical journals. According to current on-line database of Mathematics Genealogy Project, Richard Brualdi has 37 Ph.D. students and 48 academic descendants. The concept of incidence coloring was introduced in 1993 by Brualdi and Massey.

He received the Euler medal from the Institute of Combinatorics and its Applications in 2000. In 2012, he was elected a fellow of the Society for Industrial and Applied Mathematics. That same year, he became an inaugural fellow of the American Mathematical Society.

Books
 (with Herbert J. Ryser) Combinatorial Matrix Theory, Cambridge Univ. Press
 Richard A. Brualdi, Introductory Combinatorics, Prentice-Hall, Upper Saddle River, N.J.
 V. Pless, R. A. Brualdi, and W. C. Huffman, Handbook of Coding Theory, Elsevier Science, New York, 1998

 Richard A. Brualdi and Dragos Cvetkovic, A Combinatorial Approach to Matrix Theory and Its Applications, CRC Press, Boca Raton Fla., 2009.
 Richard A. Brualdi and Bryan Shader, Matrices of Sign-Solvable Linear Systems, Cambridge Tracts in Mathematics, Vol. 116, Cambridge Univ. Press, 1995.
 Richard A. Brualdi, The Mutually Beneficial Relationship Between Graphs and Matrices, American Mathematical Society, CBMS Series, 2012.

Selected articles
 
 
 
 
 
 
 
 with Jeffrey A. Ross: 
 with J. Csima: 
 with Bo Lian Liu:

References

External links
 Richard Brualdi at University of Wisconsin- Madison website

20th-century American mathematicians
21st-century American mathematicians
Combinatorialists
Syracuse University alumni
University of Wisconsin–Madison faculty
Fellows of the American Mathematical Society
Living people
1939 births
Fellows of the Society for Industrial and Applied Mathematics
Mathematicians from New York (state)